The Burden of Hope is the debut studio album by American experimental rock band Grails, released on Neurot Recordings in 2003.

Track listing
All songs written by Grails, except Track 6, written by Alan Bishop, Charles Gocher and Rick Bishop.

Personnel
Grails
Emil Amos – Drums, Steel Guitar
Alex Hall – Guitar
Zak Riles – Bass
William Slater – Piano, Bass, Electric piano, Guitar
Timothy Horner – Violin

References

2003 debut albums
Grails (band) albums
Neurot Recordings albums